Humboldt Bay Woolen Mill manufactured woolen cloth from 1901 to after World War II.  The mill was listed as a National Historic Monument but demolished by the City of Eureka in 1987.

History
When the Humboldt Bay Woolen Mill was built in 1901, the company was capitalized to $100,000 by several local businessmen including timber mill owner, William Carson, sheep rancher Hugh Webster McClellan, and rancher Robert Porter who continued as vice-president of the newly formed company. According to the 1902 Illustrated Map of Eureka, the other officers included J.W. Henderson, President and N. McMillan, Secretary.

The Mill manufactured woolen fabrics from 1901 until it closed after World War II.  After sitting empty for many years, it was listed on the National Register on 25 June 1982, but it only survived five more years.  After the city designated it a dangerous building in 1987, local preservationists and the Eureka Heritage Society tried to get funding to rehabilitate it, but it was torn down in the same year.

The Mill was described as an excellent example of Greek Revival architecture and one of the few industrial buildings historically not associated with timber or fishing. Some architectural features of the Mill were saved by historians before the demolition.  The site is currently a chain pharmacy, a grocery store and parking.  The destruction of this building rallied community activists to save other historically significant structures in Eureka.

References

Industrial buildings and structures on the National Register of Historic Places in California
Greek Revival architecture in California
Industrial buildings completed in 1920
Buildings and structures in Humboldt County, California
Textile mills in the United States
Buildings and structures demolished in 1987
National Register of Historic Places in Humboldt County, California